Transdev Brisbane may refer to:

 Transdev Brisbane Ferries, ferry operator in Brisbane, Australia
 Transdev Queensland, bus operator in Brisbane, Australia